The Liverpool County Football Association, simply known as the Liverpool FA, is the County Football Association in the city of Liverpool, England. It runs several league and cup competitions in the city.

Organisation
The aim of the Liverpool County Football Association Ltd (LCFA), is to establish for the benefit of all concerned within Football, the appropriate structures and systems to enable the Association to control, manage, regulate and promote the game within the area. This will enable us to assist with the development of the game, to increase the quality and quantity of participation across the various sections. The LCFA Sefton site is operated by the LCFA and boasts high-quality outdoor pitches and five 5-a-side pitches, with a full-size 3G pitch to open by January 2022.

Specific Objectives of LCFA are:

• To govern and administer all aspects of football within the County boundary
• To proactively introduce the initiatives of the Football Association to all bodies of football within the County boundary
• To actively encourage people to participate and develop their individual skills, through their participation in football

Affiliated leagues
There are a large number of leagues covering the Merseyside and Cheshire areas, many of which are affiliated to the Liverpool County FA but some are affiliated to the Cheshire County FA or Lancashire County FA.

Men's Saturday leagues

Men's Sunday leagues

Other leagues
Merseyside Ability Counts League
Merseyside Christian League

Youth leagues

Ladies and girls leagues
LCFA Women's League
LCFA Girls League
West Lancs Girl's League

Small-sided leagues

Futsal leagues
LCFA Men's Futsal League 
LCFA Women's Futsal League

Disbanded or amalgamated leagues

A number of leagues that were affiliated to the Liverpool County FA have disbanded or amalgamated with other leagues including:	 
  	
Liverpool and District Sunday League (merged 2020 with Liverpool Business Houses Football League)
Liverpool County Combination
I Zingari League
St Helens Combination
Birkenhead and Wirral League
Liverpool Shipping League
Liverpool and District CMS League
Halewood Junior League
Merseyside Junior Winter League
Rainhill and District Junior League

Affiliated member clubs

Among the notable clubs that are (or have been) affiliated to the Liverpool County FA are:

AFC Liverpool
Bootle
Burscough
Cammell Laird
City of Liverpool
Everton
Formby (now defunct)
Knowsley United (now defunct)
Liverpool
Maghull
Marine
New Brighton (now defunct)
Prescot Cables
Rylands
Skelmersdale United
Southport
South Liverpool
St Helens Town
Tranmere Rovers

Competitions

Leagues

Adult cups

Youth cups

External links

References

County football associations
Football in Merseyside
Sports organisations based in Liverpool
Sports organizations established in 1892
1892 establishments in England